Victor Frederick "Viki" Weisskopf (also spelled Viktor; September 19, 1908 – April 22, 2002) was an Austrian-born American theoretical physicist. He did postdoctoral work with Werner Heisenberg, Erwin Schrödinger, Wolfgang Pauli, and Niels Bohr. During World War II he was Group Leader of the Theoretical Division of the Manhattan Project at Los Alamos, and he later campaigned against the proliferation of nuclear weapons.

Biography 
Weisskopf was born in Vienna to Jewish parents and earned his doctorate in physics at the University of Göttingen in Germany in 1931. His brilliance in physics led to work with the great physicists exploring the atom, especially Niels Bohr, who mentored Weisskopf at his institute in Copenhagen. By the late 1930s, he realized that, as a Jew, he needed to get out of Europe. Bohr helped him find a position in the United States.

In the 1930s and 1940s, "Viki", as everyone called him, made major contributions to the development of quantum theory, especially in the area of quantum electrodynamics. One of his few regrets was that his insecurity about his mathematical abilities may have cost him a Nobel Prize when he did not publish results (which turned out to be correct) about what is now known as the Lamb shift. Nevertheless, he was nominated for the Nobel Prize in Physics numerous times later in his career.

From 1937 to 1943 he was a Professor of Physics at the University of Rochester. There, he met graduate student Esther Conwell, and together they formulated the Conwell-Weisskopf Theory, which describes the movement of electrons through semiconductors and led to a better understanding of integrated circuits, knowledge that became essential for modern computing.

After World War II, Weisskopf joined the physics faculty at MIT, ultimately becoming head of the department. In 1956, he became one of the founding members of the Physical Science Study Committee (PSSC), developing the curriculum for a revolutionary method of teaching physics at the high school level.

At MIT, he encouraged students to ask questions, and even in undergraduate physics courses, taught his students to think like physicists, not just to memorize the equations of physics. He was a memorable teacher, and delighted in posing "Fermi questions" and then helping students to work out approximate answers. For example, he would ask the maximum possible height of a mountain on the Earth, calculated from known basic physical constants. It took him about half an hour to work through an explanation of his computations, with the end result being of the same order of magnitude as the known height of Mount Everest. For an encore, he would quickly work out the analogous answers for Mars, and then Jupiter; when Mars Orbiter survey results later became available, they were consistent with his computed elevation. For his finale, he would compute the energy released by dropping a bowling ball off the highest theoretical mountain on Jupiter.

Weisskopf was a co-founder and board member of the Union of Concerned Scientists. He served as director-general of CERN from 1961 to 1966. In 1966 a Festschrift was published in his honor.

Weisskopf was awarded the Max Planck Medal in 1956 and the Prix mondial Cino Del Duca in 1972, the National Medal of Science (1980),  the Wolf Prize (1981) and the Public Welfare Medal from the National Academy of Sciences (1991).

Weisskopf was a member of the National Academy of Sciences and the American Philosophical Society. He was president of the American Physical Society (1960–61) and the American Academy of Arts and Sciences (1976–1979).

He was appointed by Pope Paul VI to the 70-member Pontifical Academy of Sciences in 1975, and in 1981 he led a team of four scientists sent by Pope John Paul II to talk to President Ronald Reagan about the need to prohibit the use of nuclear weapons.

In a joint statement "Preserving and Cherishing the Earth" with other noted scientists including Carl Sagan, it concluded that: "The historical record makes clear that religious teaching, example, and leadership are powerfully able to influence personal conduct and commitment ... Thus, there is a vital role for religion and science."

Personal life 
His first wife, Ellen Tvede, died in 1989. Wiesskopf died on April 22, 2002, and was survived by his second wife Duscha, daughter of accidental Night of the Long Knives victim Willi Schmid.

Decorations and awards 
 1956: Max Planck Medal
 1971: First recipient of the George Gamow Memorial Lectureship Award from the University of Colorado Boulder
 1972: Prix mondial Cino Del Duca
 1976: Oersted Medal
 1977: Marian Smoluchowski Medal
 1978: Pour le Mérite for Arts and Sciences
 1980: National Medal of Science
 1981: Wolf Prize
 1982: Austrian Decoration for Science and Art
 1983: J. Robert Oppenheimer Memorial Prize
 1984: Albert Einstein Medal
 1990: Ludwig Wittgenstein Prize of the Austrian Science Fund
 1991: Public Welfare Medal (United States National Academy of Sciences)
 2000: Grand Gold Medal with Star for Services to the Republic of Austria
There is a street, Route Weisskopf, named after Weisskopf at CERN, Geneva, Switzerland.

Quotes 

In class one day, speaking to junior physics majors (Spring, 1957):  "There is no such thing as a stupid question." Citing initial teacher-student interactions, Noam Chomsky attributes to Victor the educational maxim,

Publications

References

Bibliography

External links 

 Annotated bibliography for Victor Weisskopf from the Alsos Digital Library for Nuclear Issues
 "A Scientist's Odyssey": A Conversation with Victor Weisskopf, April 7, 1988, transcript and RealMedia webcast
 
 Oral history interview transcript with Victor Fredrick Weisskopf 10 July 1965, American Institute of Physics, Niels Bohr Library & Archives
 

1908 births
2002 deaths
20th-century Austrian physicists
Austrian nuclear physicists
Quantum physicists
Manhattan Project people
Albert Einstein Medal recipients
Enrico Fermi Award recipients
Fellows of the American Academy of Arts and Sciences
Wolf Prize in Physics laureates
Fellows of the American Physical Society
Members of the French Academy of Sciences
Members of the United States National Academy of Sciences
National Medal of Science laureates
Foreign Members of the USSR Academy of Sciences
Foreign Members of the Russian Academy of Sciences
People associated with CERN
American anti–nuclear weapons activists
Jewish emigrants from Austria to the United States after the Anschluss
University of Göttingen alumni
Academic staff of ETH Zurich
Jewish American scientists
Recipients of the Austrian Decoration for Science and Art
Recipients of the Grand Decoration with Star for Services to the Republic of Austria
Recipients of the Pour le Mérite (civil class)
Scientists from Vienna
Winners of the Max Planck Medal
Members of the German Academy of Sciences at Berlin
MIT Center for Theoretical Physics faculty
Members of the American Philosophical Society
Presidents of the American Physical Society